Lukhan Salakaia-Loto (formerly Lukhan Tui, born 19 September 1996), is an Australian rugby union player. He plays for the Northampton Saints in Premiership Rugby. He has played for the Queensland Reds in Super Rugby, and his usual position is lock but he has also played in the backrow for the Wallabies particularly at blindside flanker.

Family and early life
Lukhan Herman Lealaiauloto Tui was born to parents Herman Lealaiauloto [Ermehn] and Teresa Tuimaseve, his mother, at Otara, South Auckland in New Zealand before he moved with his mother to Sydney, Australia, at a young age.

He changed his name to Lukhan Salakaia-Loto later as an adult in 2018 following the death of the stepfather who had raised him, hyphenating Salakaia as the surname of his late stepfather, mother and siblings with Loto from part of his birth father's last name. Lukhan's Samoan bloodline comes from the villages of Lelepa in Savaii and Faleula in Upolu.

Lukhan attended John Edmondson High School in Liverpool, Australia. He initially played junior rugby league and was selected in age-group teams for Western Suburbs, and NSW Samoa.

Rugby career
He joined the Randwick club in 2014 to play rugby union for their colts side. In 2015, he played for Randwick's first grade Shute Shield team, and was named (as Lukhan Lealaiaulolo-Tui) for the Australia under-20 team that played in the World Junior Championship in Italy.

Later in 2015, he signed a three-year deal with the Queensland Reds.

He was selected in the  squad for the National Rugby Championship in 2015, but did not play for that side due to injury. He made his NRC debut the following season for the  team.

On 1 March 2022, it was confirmed that Salakaia-Loto would move to England to join Northampton Saints in the Premiership Rugby ahead of the 2022-23 season.

In January 2023 Salakaia-Loto was suspended for four weeks following his sending-off for dangerous play in a Champions Cup match against La Rochelle.

References

External links
 Stats on itsrugby.co.uk

1996 births
Australian rugby union players
Australian sportspeople of Samoan descent
Australian people of New Zealand descent
Australia international rugby union players
Queensland Reds players
Queensland Country (NRC team) players
Rugby union locks
Rugby union players from Sydney
People from Auckland
Living people
Brisbane City (rugby union) players
Northampton Saints players